The 1978 XIV FIBA International Christmas Tournament "Trofeo Raimundo Saporta" was the 14th edition of the FIBA International Christmas Tournament. It took place at Sports City of Real Madrid Pavilion, Madrid, Spain, on 24, 25 and 26 December 1978 with the participations of Real Madrid (champions of the 1977–78 FIBA European Champions Cup), Joventut Freixenet (champions of the 1977–78 Liga Española de Baloncesto), Czechoslovakia and Obras Sanitarias.

League stage

Day 1, December 24, 1978

|}

Day 2, December 25, 1978

|}

Day 3, December 26, 1978

|}

Final standings

References

1978–79 in European basketball
1978–79 in Spanish basketball